Kalawati Bhuria (1972 – 24 April 2021) was an Indian politician and Member of the Madhya Pradesh Legislative Assembly for Joba from 2018 till her death in 2021. Bhuria died from COVID-19 at age 49 in Indore.

References

1972 births
2021 deaths
Madhya Pradesh MLAs 2018–2023
Deaths from the COVID-19 pandemic in India
People from Alirajpur district
Women members of the Madhya Pradesh Legislative Assembly
Indian National Congress politicians from Madhya Pradesh
21st-century Indian women politicians